Quercus hypophaea is an uncommon species of tree in the beech family Fagaceae. It has been found only in Taiwan.  It is placed in subgenus Cerris, section Cyclobalanopsis.

Quercus hypophaea is a tree up to 18 meters tall with whitish twigs. Leaves can be as much as 10 cm long.

References

External links
line drawings, Flora of China Illustrations vol. 4, fig. 379, drawings 4-7 at right

hypophaea
Plants described in 1913
Endemic flora of Taiwan
Trees of Taiwan